The International Street and Ball Hockey Federation (ISBHF) is the international governing body for the sport of street hockey. The ISBHF is headquartered in Prague, Czech Republic. Elio Pascuzzo of Canada is the current ISBHF President following his election to the post for the 2022–2024 term. ISBHF organises World Championships and other tournaments around the world. These tournaments include:

Men:
Ball Hockey World Championship - A & B Pool
Masters' Ball Hockey World Championship
Asia Cup
Women's:
Women's Ball Hockey World Championship
Junior:

U20:
U20 Ball Hockey World Championship
U18:
U18 Ball Hockey World Championship
U16:
U16 Ball Hockey World Cup
U20 Girls:
U20 Girls Ball Hockey World Cup

ISBHF World Championships

ISBHF Women World Championships

ISBHF U20 Junior World Championships

ISBHF U18 Junior World Championships

ISBHF U16 Junior World Championships

ISBHF Women's U20 Junior World Championships

References

External links 
Official Website

International sports organizations
Street hockey
Ball hockey